Newark is a city in Alameda County, California, United States.  It was incorporated as a city in September 1955.  Newark is an enclave, surrounded by the city of Fremont. The three cities of Newark, Fremont, and Union City make up the Tri-City Area.  Newark's population was 47,529 at the 2020 census making it the third largest city in the US named Newark after Newark, New Jersey, and Newark, Ohio.

Geography

The western edge of the city is near the southern end of the San Francisco Bay. State Route 84 runs through the city, and continues as the Dumbarton Bridge to cross the San Francisco Bay to reach Menlo Park. Interstate 880 serves as the eastern boundary with Fremont.

History
Newark was named after Newark Castle, Port Glasgow, in Scotland by J. Barr Robertson.

Before it was settled by Europeans, Newark was home to the Ohlone Native American Peoples. The first European settlement in the area was by the Spanish missionaries of Mission San José, whose territory covered much of the present-day cities of Newark, Fremont, and Union City. In 1878 land belonging to Washington Township of Alameda County was purchased by The Pacific Land Investment Company and subdivided to form the town of Newark.

Newark was incorporated in September 1955.

Demographics

2010
The 2010 United States Census reported that Newark had a population of 42,574. The racial makeup of Newark was 17,567 (41.3%) White, 2,002 (4.7%) Black, 279 (0.7%) Native American, 11,571 (27.2%) Asian, 621 (1.5%) Pacific Islander, 7,735 (18.2%) from other races, and 2,799 (6.6%) from two or more races. Hispanic or Latino of any race were 14,994 persons (35.2%).

The Census reported that 42,428 people (99.7% of the population) lived in households, 145 (0.3%) lived in non-institutionalized group quarters, and 0 (0%) were institutionalized.

There were 12,972 households, out of which 5,643 (43.5%) had children under the age of 18 living in them, 7,832 (60.4%) were opposite-sex married couples living together, 1,716 (13.2%) had a female householder with no husband present, 786 (6.1%) had a male householder with no wife present.  There were 659 (5.1%) unmarried opposite-sex partnerships, and 93 (0.7%) same-sex married couples or partnerships. 1,942 households (15.0%) were made up of individuals, and 705 (5.4%) had someone living alone who was 65 years of age or older. The average household size was 3.27.  There were 10,334 families (79.7% of all households); the average family size was 3.60.

The age distribution of the population shows 10,799 people (25.4%) under the age of 18, 3,824 people (9.0%) aged 18 to 24, 12,697 people (29.8%) aged 25 to 44, 10,727 people (25.2%) aged 45 to 64, and 4,526 people (10.6%) who were 65 years of age or older.  The median age was 35.4 years. For every 100 females, there were 99.3 males.  For every 100 females age 18 and over, there were 96.8 males.

The homeowner vacancy rate was 1.0%; the rental vacancy rate was 4.0%.  28,489 people (66.9% of the population) lived in owner-occupied housing units and 13,939 people (32.7%) lived in rental housing units.

2000
As of the census of 2000, there were 42,471 people, 12,992 households, and 10,341 families residing in the city.

There were 12,992 households, out of which 40.2% had children under the age of 18 living with them, 62.2% were married couples living together, 11.6% had a female householder with no husband present, and 20.4% were non-families. 14.1% of all households were made up of individuals, and 4.2% had someone living alone who was 65 years of age or older.  The average household size was 3.26 and the average family size was 3.59.

In the city, the age distribution of the population shows 27.3% under the age of 18, 9.5% from 18 to 24, 34.3% from 25 to 44, 21.2% from 45 to 64, and 7.8% who were 65 years of age or older.  The median age was 33 years. For every 100 females, there were 101.4 males.  For every 100 females age 18 and over, there were 99.2 males.

The median income for a household in the city was $69,350, and the median income for a family was $71,351 (these figures had risen to $78,367 and $81,652 respectively as of a 2007 estimate). Males had a median income of $46,061 versus $34,959 for females. The per capita income for the city was $23,641.  About 4.2% of families and 5.5% of the population were below the poverty line, including 5.7% of those under age 18 and 6.9% of those age 65 or over.

Politics

Economy 
Newark's economy is at the edge of Silicon Valley and shares its economic pattern.

Cargill Salt, previously known as Leslie Salt, operates a large salt refinery in Newark which cleans solar salt produced in salt evaporation ponds in the San Francisco Bay.

Wedgewood manufactured stoves in town from the 1910s until the 1940s. Peterbilt manufactured trucks in Newark from the early 1960s up to the mid-1980s. In 1956 Trailmobile moved its manufacturing and assembly plant from Berkeley to a new  facility at 6000 Stevenson Boulevard in Newark, adjacent to the Peterbilt truck facility. The Trailmobile plant closed in 1975 and moved to a new facility in Charleston, Illinois. From the mid-1950s through the early 1960s, A.O. Smith Corporation of Kankakee, Illinois, built residential and commercial-grade glass-lined water heaters at a large manufacturing facility located on Sycamore Street. The plant was later acquired by the National Steel Corporation, which continued water heater manufacturing at the plant until the early 1970s.

The city houses the NewPark Mall, a super-regional shopping center, with anchor stores Macy's and Burlington Coat Factory, and over 140 other retailers. A  addition at NewPark, including restaurants, entertainment and a multiplex movie theater with IMAX, opened in late 2015.

The former Sun Microsystems site near I-880, State Route 84 and the Dumbarton Bridge, was purchased by BioMed Realty Trust and is now known as the Pacific Research Center.

Top employers
According to the city's June 2020 Comprehensive Annual Financial Report, the top employers in the city are:

Culture and recreation 
The City of Newark has thirteen parks and sport play facilities, the George M. Silliman Community Activity and Family Aquatic Center (aka the Silliman Center). The Family Aquatic Center portion of the Silliman Center opened in the summer of 2004 and includes a  indoor swim facility specifically designed for recreation, fitness, and instruction programs for the entire family.

Newark also houses a portion of the Don Edwards San Francisco Bay National Wildlife refuge along with the city of Fremont.

Newark also hosts a festival in honor of the city's founding.  "Newark Days" is a four-day Festival/Celebration that takes place every September on the Macgregor Soccer fields (adjacent to the Community center on Cedar Blvd).

Transportation 
Newark lies near the intersection of I-880, State Route 84, and the Dumbarton Bridge.

Newark is served by AC Transit bus system. Surrounding Fremont is the access point for most transportation services, including Fremont and Union City BART stations, and ACE and Amtrak trains.

Future rail

Caltrain is planning a Dumbarton rail that would run between the Peninsula and Alameda County. This project would add four stations to the Caltrain system: Union City, Fremont-Centerville, Newark, and Menlo Park/East Palo Alto. Dumbarton Rail is currently undergoing environmental and engineering review.

Education 
Newark is home to a new campus of Ohlone College, a member of the California Community Colleges system.  Other nearby educational centers include the University of Phoenix, ITT Institute, DeVry University, and Unitek College.

Newark has two high schools, Newark Memorial High School and Bridgepoint High School, and one junior high school, Newark Junior High School. Bridgepoint High School is an alternative high school on the MacGregor Campus which also houses Newark Adult School. Elementary schools include Kennedy, Graham, Lincoln, Musick, Schilling, and Snow, Birch Grove Primary (K-3)(formerly Bunker), and Birch Grove Intermediate (4-6) (formerly Milani) Schools and one private Catholic elementary-8th grade, St. Edward's Catholic School.

Climate

Notable people
Terry Alderete, businesswoman
Bayley, professional wrestler
Larry Bettencourt, NFL player for the Green Bay Packers, MLB player for the St. Louis Browns
Paul Bostaph, drummer
Rollie Fingers, MLB Hall of Fame relief pitcher
Chris Flexen, pitcher, Seattle Mariners
Steven J. Lopes,  Bishop of the Personal Ordinariate of the Chair of Saint Peter
Joey Lucchesi, pitcher, San Diego Padres
Freddie Muller, infielder, Boston Red Sox
Rocky Pamplin, author, former football player, member of the Beach Boys
Joe Rudi, MLB player
Ron Thompson, guitarist
Christopher Titus, comedian
Bill Walsh lived in Newark from 1957 to 1960 while working at Washington High School in Fremont.
Elaine Welteroth, American journalist and former Editor-in-Chief of Teen Vogue

References

External links

 
Fremont Macaroni Kid Free family resource with local events and more in Newark, Fremont and Union City.
  Alameda County Library, Newark Branch
 Newark Library Blog
  Newark Unified School District
 

 
1955 establishments in California
Cities in Alameda County, California
Cities in the San Francisco Bay Area
Enclaves in the United States
Incorporated cities and towns in California
Populated coastal places in California